Congorilla, originally a human character known as Congo Bill, is a superhero appearing in comic books published by DC Comics and Vertigo Comics. Originally co-created by writer Whitney Ellsworth and artist George Papp, he was later transformed into Congorilla by Robert Bernstein and Howard Sherman. The character first appeared in More Fun Comics #56 (June 1940).

Publication history
Congo Bill was a long-running DC Comics adventure comic strip, often reminiscent of Alex Raymond's Jungle Jim newspaper strip. Originating in More Fun Comics #56, the strip was a moderate success and ran there until issue #67 (May 1941), after which it moved to Action Comics from issue #37 (June 1941).

Action Comics #191 (April 1954) saw the introduction of Janu the Jungle Boy, a young boy brought up in the jungle after his father had been killed by a tiger. In 1954, DC awarded Congo Bill his own title, published on a bi-monthly schedule, which lasted for seven issues (August/September 1954 – August/September 1955).

Congo Bill encountered the legendary golden gorilla in Action Comics #224 (January 1957). He also encountered the similarly named Kongorilla in Action Comics #228 (May 1957). In issue #248 (January 1959), Congo Bill was transformed into Congorilla and the title of the strip was likewise changed. The Congorilla series ran in Action Comics until issue #261 (February 1960), after which it was transferred to Adventure Comics from issues #270 (March 1960) to #283 (April 1961).

Since the demise of its own series, Congorilla has mainly been seen as a guest star in other titles, including as part of the Forgotten Heroes. The character finally received a mini-series of his own in 1992, where Congo Bill is betrayed by his (now corrupt) ward Janu, who usurps the Congorilla identity and Bill is forced to fight his adopted son to the death. Congo Bill became blind in his left eye, making it hard for him to see after fighting his son to the end. In 1999, DC Comics once again brought Congo Bill back for another four-issue limited series under the company's mature readership Vertigo Comics imprint.

Congorilla returned in the 2009 series Cry for Justice, joining a proactive splinter faction of the Justice League. Following that series, Congorilla became a main character in Justice League of America as a full-time member of the Justice League. He also starred in the Starman/Congorilla one-shot (March 2011) alongside close friend and teammate Starman (Mikaal Tomas).

Congo Bill next appeared in the Rebirth continuity as the warden of Monster Rock, where he trained the hero Damage on how to control the giant monster one turns into.

Fictional character biography
William "Congo Bill" Glenmorgan was born in 1898, the son of a Scottish gamekeeper. At one point he was a member of the IRA, and during World War I he served as soldier in the Battle of the Somme in France 1916 and also Battle of Flanders Field in Passendale, Belgium. He worked his way up a spy in Austria. He later became a globe-trotting adventurer, and for a time worked for the Worldwide Insurance Company, protecting policies they had written and saving the company from fraudulent payouts.

Bill grew content to live in his adopted African home, swearing to protect it from harm. There he befriended a witch-doctor known as Chief Kawolo. When Kawolo was mortally injured in a fall, he summoned Bill to his bedside, and offered him a magic ring. Kawolo told the skeptical Congo Bill that, by rubbing the ring, he could transfer his consciousness into the body of the legendary Golden Gorilla. He accepted the ring to humor his friend's dying wish. Several weeks later, an earthquake trapped Bill in a deep cave. With no possible escape, Congo Bill hopelessly rubbed the magic ring. Instantly, his mind was transported into the body of the Golden Gorilla. Racing to the cave-in, he used his massive strength to clear the blocked entrance and wondering what had become of his body without him being "home". He realized that when his consciousness entered the body of the Golden Gorilla, the creature's consciousness entered his own body. Bill decides to use his new powers to fight crime in the jungle. He is later assisted by Janu, a young boy raised in the jungle.

Justice League
Years later, Bill (now known as Congorilla) is trapped in his gorilla form upon the death of his human body. He becomes the protector of a band of gorillas, and friend of the South African hero Freedom Beast. When the gorillas and Freedom Beast are slaughtered by hunters, Congorilla decides to seek justice. After the trail leads to the villain Prometheus, Congorilla teams up with Starman, and eventually a splinter faction of the Justice League. After Prometheus's death, Congorilla becomes a full-time member of the Justice League.

During his time with the League, Bill faces off against such foes as the rogue Starheart and Eclipso, and becomes close friends with Starman and Supergirl. He is also part of a much larger makeshift Justice League squad when the return of Batman from a seeming death threatens to destroy time and space. After Batman Inc. appoints the vigilante Batwing as the official Batman of Africa, Congorilla realizes that the continent is too big for one hero to handle. He ultimately chooses to resign from the JLA in order to help organize the superheroes of Africa into a more efficient team, as well as to find a worthy successor to carry on Freedom Beast's legacy.

Powers and abilities
Before becoming Congorilla, Bill is a skilled hunter, explorer, and marksman. As Congorilla, Bill's simian body granted him supernatural strength, stamina, durability, agility, reflexes, and senses, self-healing capabilities, the ability to grow in size, and virtual immortality. In order to become Congorilla, he originally rubs a magic ring, which would swap his consciousness with that of the Golden Gorilla.

Other versions
In the Elseworlds story JLA: The Nail, Congo Bill (in his Congorilla form) makes an appearance in Professor Hamilton's Cadmus Labs.

In the alternate timeline of the "Flashpoint" storyline, Congorilla is killed by Gorilla Grodd in Gorilla City's arena.

A future version of Congorilla appears in Alan Moore's rejected proposal for the limited series Twilight of the Superheroes. Now a crime boss in the superhero ghetto that hosts most of the retired or aged Golden Age crime fighters, Congorilla has remained in the body of the Golden Gorilla for decades, since his aging human body became too fragile. However, the body of Congo Bill refuses to die, is still inhabited by the spirit of the Golden Gorilla, and is now hidden away in Congorilla's apartment.

In other media

Television
A variation of William Glenmorgan appears in the Arrow episode "My Name Is Emiko Queen", portrayed by Edward Foy. This version is a human mercenary.

Film
Congo Bill was filmed as a 15 chapter movie serial by Columbia Pictures in 1948, starred Don McGuire and Cleo Moore, and was produced by Sam Katzman.

Miscellaneous
 Adventure Comics #283 appears in The Andy Griffith Show episode "The Great Filling Station Robbery", in which it is read by Gomer Pyle.
 Congorilla appeared in issue #19 of the Young Justice tie-in comic book series. This version is a gorilla deity and a member of Solovar's troop who escaped being experimented on by the Brain and Ultra-Humanite years prior.

References

1994 comics debuts
1999 comics debuts
Comics characters introduced in 1940
DC Comics animals
DC Comics fantasy characters
DC Comics superheroes
DC Comics characters who are shapeshifters
DC Comics characters who use magic
DC Comics characters with accelerated healing
DC Comics characters with superhuman senses
DC Comics characters with superhuman strength
Fictional characters who can change size 
Fictional characters with immortality
fictional characters with spirit possession or body swapping abilities
Fictional characters with superhuman durability or invulnerability
Fictional explorers
Fictional hunters
Adventure film characters
Gorilla characters in comics
Vertigo Comics titles
Jungle (genre) comics
Jungle superheroes
Characters created by George Papp
Characters created by Robert Bernstein
American comics adapted into films
Jungle men
Golden Age superheroes
Fictional people from the 19th-century
British superheroes
Fictional Scottish people
Fictional World War I veterans
Fictional British secret agents